Son de Mar refers to:

Son de Mar is a Spanish film
Son de Mar (soundtrack) is the soundtrack to the Spanish film by the same name.